Ryan Benesch (born January 30, 1985) is a Canadian professional lacrosse player who plays for the Halifax Thunderbirds in the National Lacrosse League. Benesch has also played for the Albany FireWolves, Colorado Mammoth, Buffalo Bandits, Minnesota Swarm, Edmonton Rush, Toronto Rock, and Panther City LC and was the 2011 NLL scoring leader. Benesch was born in Kitchener, Ontario, Canada.

Professional career
Benesch was drafted first overall by the San Jose Stealth in the 2006 NLL entry draft, but was traded to Toronto Rock along with Chad Thompson and Kevin Fines for 2005 NLL MVP Colin Doyle. Benesch played his minor lacrosse in Kitchener-Waterloo as well as his Junior 'A' lacrosse. He is currently the second leading scorer all-time in Kitchener-Waterloo Braves history behind Colin Doyle.

Benesch was named Rookie of the Week three times in the 2007 season, in weeks 4, 11, and 12, and was also named Rookie of the Month in March. On May 8, 2007, Benesch was awarded the Rookie of the Year Award, and named to the All-Rookie team.

Early in the 2009 NLL season, Benesch and veteran Derek Suddons were traded to the Edmonton Rush for future draft picks. After one season in Edmonton, he was traded again, this time to the Minnesota Swarm along with Scott Self and a draft pick for Scott Stewart, Ryan Ward, Justin Norbraten, and Richard Morgan.

After four seasons in Minnesota where he averaged 83 points per season (leading the league in 2011), Benesch was traded to the Buffalo Bandits along with Andrew Watt for two first round draft picks and a third round pick.  Benesch was traded to the Colorado Mammoth, along with a conditional third round draft pick in exchange for Callum Crawford and Alex Buque on August 1, 2017.

Benesch was selected by the Panther City LC in the 2021 NLL expansion draft. He was traded to the Albany FireWolves after three games with Panther City LC.

Canadian Box career

Junior
Benesch played five full years for the Kitchener-Waterloo Braves of the OLA Junior A Lacrosse League. In 2002, Benesch was given the "Joey Nieuwendyk Award" for Rookie of the Year. He finished his junior career with an outstanding 178 goals and 391 points in just 104 games.

Senior
Benesch currently plays for the Victoria Shamrocks of the Western Lacrosse Association after his playing rights were acquired from the Kitchener-Waterloo Kodiaks on 29 May 2010, along with those of Chet Koneczny. He was awarded the "Gene Dopp Memorial Trophy" for Rookie of the year in 2007. In 2009, Benesch won the Presidents Cup with the Owen Sound Woodsmen of the OLA Senior B Lacrosse League.

Statistics

NLL
Reference:

OLA

References

Awards

1985 births
Living people
Albany FireWolves players
Buffalo Bandits players
Canadian lacrosse players
Colorado Mammoth players
Edmonton Rush players
Halifax Thunderbirds players
Lacrosse forwards
Lacrosse people from Ontario
Minnesota Swarm players
National Lacrosse League major award winners
Panther City LC players
Rochester Knighthawks players
Sportspeople from Kitchener, Ontario
Toronto Rock players